Balneicellaceae is a family of bacteria in the order of Bacteroidales with a single genus (Balneicella).

References

Bacteroidia